Andrey Ilyich Merzlikin (born 24 March 1973) is a Russian film and theater actor.

Early life
Andrey Merzlikin was born in Kaliningrad near Moscow. In the first education – radio engineer of space engineering, then earned a degree in economics. In parallel, he graduated from the acting department Gerasimov Institute of Cinematography (workshop Y. Kindinova). While studying at the institute, he starred in the short film "How I Spent My Summer" (dir. N. Pogonicheva) and received the prize for best actor at the film festival VGIK.

Personal life
In March 2006 Andrey married Anna Osokina – psychologist. They have three children: son Fyodor (born 2006), daughter Serafima (born 2008) and daughter Evdokiya (born 2010). Four children (born January 2016).

Career
Merzlikin has appeared in over fifteen films and in several television productions.

Filmography

Civil position 
Actor supports Russian heroes in the war in Donbas. He calls them heroes. In May 2015 Merzlikin visited free Donetsk, where he and other Russian actors presented film "The Brest Fortress"

References

External links

1973 births
Living people
People from Korolyov, Moscow Oblast
Russian male film actors
Russian male television actors
20th-century Russian male actors
21st-century Russian male actors
Russian male stage actors
Gerasimov Institute of Cinematography alumni